Nebiler is a village in Dikili district of İzmir Province, Turkey.  The village is situated to the east of Turkish state highway . The population of Nebiler is 167  as of 2011.

References

İzmir Province
Villages in Dikili District